Drones is the seventh studio album by English rock band Muse, released on 5 June 2015 through Warner Bros. Records and the band's own Helium-3 imprint. The album was recorded between October 2014 and April 2015 at the Warehouse Studio in Vancouver, with orchestral sections recorded at Officine Meccaniche in Milan, and was produced by the band and Robert John "Mutt" Lange. Drones is a concept album following a soldier's abandonment, indoctrination as a "human drone", and eventual defection. It also comments on the Obama administration’s drone program. After their previous albums incorporated orchestral and electronic music, Muse aimed to return to a more straightforward rock sound musically.

Drones received mixed-to-positive reviews from critics, who praised its instrumentation but criticised its concept and lyrics. It topped 21 international charts, including the UK Albums Chart (where it became Muse's fifth consecutive number-one album) and the US Billboard 200. It sold over a million copies worldwide in 2015, making it the year's 19th-bestselling album. At the 58th Annual Grammy Awards, it won the award for Best Rock Album. The album was listed on 41 in the NME albums of the year 2015. Diffuser.fm named it the 42nd best of the year.

It was supported by an expansive world tour with appearances at several festivals and arenas, lasting from 2015 to 2016 and grossing $88.5 million from 132 shows. A concert film of the tour, entitled Muse: Drones World Tour, was released in cinemas in July 2018.

Background
On their previous albums The Resistance (2009) and The 2nd Law (2012), Muse incorporated orchestral and electronic music. In December 2013, they released the live album and video Live at Rome Olympic Stadium; songwriter Matt Bellamy said the band wanted the release "to capture some of the extremes of what we've been doing since we want to go in a different direction in the future."

Muse began writing their seventh album soon after the Rome concert. Bellamy stated that the album "should be something that really does strip away the additional things that we've experimented with on the last two albums... I kind of feel like it will be nice to reconnect and remind ourselves of just the basics of who we are." The band felt the electronic side of their music was becoming too dominant. According to bassist Chris Wolstenholme, some of the music on The 2nd Law was "somewhat of a bore to play live, and I'm not too certain how much of it worked for our shows ... The logical step was to strip away all the outer layers and go back to the way we started. Sometimes, making things simpler makes them more powerful."

Recording
In October 2014, Muse entered the Warehouse Studio in Vancouver. After having self-produced their previous two albums, Muse worked with producer Robert John "Mutt" Lange to spend less time mixing and reviewing takes and focus on performance. Tommaso Colliva and Rich Costey served as additional producers. After having used several different bass guitars and effect pedals for The 2nd Law, Wolstenholme used only one bass guitar and a small number of pedals, hoping to find a cohesive sound.

The first recording session ended on 19 October, with the band calling it "emotional". Muse re-entered the studio in November 2014. On 1 April 2015, drummer Dominic Howard and mixer Rich Costey indicated on their Instagram accounts that they had finished mixing the album. The result was a simpler, more consistent rock sound with less elaborate production and genre experimentation.

Composition
Drones has been described as featuring alternative rock, hard rock, progressive rock, and progressive metal. It is a concept album about the dehumanisation of modern warfare. The story begins with "Dead Inside", where the protagonist loses hope and becomes vulnerable to the dark forces of "Psycho". He eventually defects, revolts and overcomes his enemies.

Answering fan questions on Twitter in September 2014, Bellamy said the album's themes include deep ecology, the empathy gap, and World War III. In March 2015, he said:

In an interview in the same month, Bellamy described Drones as "a modern metaphor for what it is to lose empathy ... through modern technology, and obviously through drone warfare in particular, it's possible to actually do quite horrific things by remote control, at a great distance, without actually feeling any of the consequences, or even feeling responsible in some way."

Promotion and release
On 26 January 2015, Muse revealed the album title in an Instagram video featuring a mixing desk with audio samples and a screen stating "Artist – Muse, Album – Drones." They also began using the hashtag "#MuseDrones" on Twitter and Instagram. On 6 February, American artist Matt Mahurin announced he had created artwork for the album. On 8 March, the band shared a snippet of the new song "Psycho" and mentioned "mixing with a very tight deadline".

On 12 March, Muse released a lyric video for "Psycho" on their YouTube channel, and made the song available for download with the album pre-order. Critics have described "Psycho" as a hard rock and glam rock song with elements of nu metal.

On 23 March, "Dead Inside" was released as the album's lead single with a lyric video on Muse's YouTube channel. On 18 May, Muse released a lyric video for "Mercy" and released the song on Spotify. On 29 May, a lyric video for "Reapers" was released on YouTube, followed by "The Handler" on 2 June and "[JFK]" with "Defector" on 3 June.

In an album review for The Observer, Kitty Empire commented that the pacy song "Reapers" "exposes the overlap between the unfeeling destruction of drone warfare and the unfeeling destruction wrought by people tearing each other apart," referring to Muse frontman Matt Bellamy's break-up from fiancée Kate Hudson. She also compared Bellamy to Yngwie Malmsteen, noting that the song contains "meaty riffs."

Drones was released on 5 June 2015 in Europe and 8 June in the United Kingdom under Warner Bros. Records and Helium-3. On 3 November, Muse released "Revolt" as the third single from the album along with a music video on iTunes.  The fourth single "Aftermath" was released on 11 March 2016, and on 16 April, the final single "Reapers" was released as a 7" single for of Record Store Day.

Tour

From 15 to 24 March 2015, the band played the Psycho Tour, six concerts in small venues in the UK. Starting with Radio 1's Big Weekend in May 2015, the band embarked on the Drones World Tour in support of the album, which led to the release of the live video Muse: Drones World Tour. Bellamy confirmed they would tour North America in late 2015 and Europe in 2016, and also said they would be flying drones over the audience during the shows. However, two concerts in San Diego and Las Vegas were rescheduled due to "technical and logistical" challenges, while the drones were not used at all in three gigs, and one gig in Detroit saw several drones fail simultaneously. From 15 to 24 March 2015, the band played the Psycho UK Tour, six concerts in small venues in the UK. The Psycho Tour was a short tour by the English rock band Muse during March 2015. The tour was first hinted at by guitarist and lead vocalist Matthew Bellamy's Twitter on March 10, 2015, with the tour being officially announced the next day on the band's Facebook page, along with the lyric video for "Psycho".

The dynamics of this tour were different from what Muse had used in the past few tours, where they relied heavily on theatrical stage-craft and production, this tour took the band into smaller venues around the UK and the United States, the stage design was only a simple lighting rig and, for all but one concert, a backdrop displaying the cover art of their upcoming album. The band had not played in many of the venues since the Origin of Symmetry tour which took place from 2001 to 2002. The band was supported by Marmozets on the tour. Part of the tour also took place outside the UK in the United States.

In May 2015, the band embarked on the Drones World Tour in support of the album, which led to the release of the live video Muse: Drones World Tour. Bellamy confirmed they would tour North America in late 2015 and Europe in 2016, and also said they would be flying drones over the audience during the shows. However, two concerts in San Diego and Las Vegas were rescheduled due to "technical and logistical" challenges, while the drones were not used at all in three gigs, and one gig in Detroit saw several drones fail simultaneously. During the first leg of the tour, the band had their debut performance at Download Festival, which they also headlined. The new tour stage set up featured 11 LED pillars which could be manually pushed back and forth by members of the crew to accommodate the show. Bellamy compared this set up to The Resistance tour on his Instagram. An updated version of this set was used for the remaining dates in 2017, complete with new lighting rigs and lasers.

Reception

At Metacritic, which assigns a rating out of 100 to reviews from mainstream critics, Drones has an average score of 63 based on 25 reviews. Kerrang! gave Drones a perfect score, calling it "a claustrophobic classic that sharpens the focus of what is possible in the name of high-minded rock." Q wrote that despite Muse's stated goal of returning to their roots, "Drones is anything but back-to-basics garage rock... befitting of its proggy conceptual narrative about state mind control, it's an album of rambling interests." David Fricke of Rolling Stone called the album "a truly guilty pleasure" and praised its "chunky update of the guitar-bass-drums charge" of the band's earlier albums as "what Muse do best." The NME wrote that the album's "trademark Muse themes of brainwashing, warmongering superpowers, suppression of The Truth and the urgent need to fight the hand that bleeds us still resonate in 2015, but obliquely ... Muse's music once more matches [Bellamy's] adventurous intrigue."

AllMusic wrote that "it's hard to avoid [Muse's] conclusion that war is bad, but this inclination to write everything in bold, italicized capital letters is an asset when it comes to music." Kitty Empire of The Observer wrote that despite the "trite" lyrics and "confusing" plot, some of Drones was "fist-pumpingly ace; a timely restatement of the need for popular music to evoke both thought and dopamine rush." Ian Cohen of Pitchfork found that Drones lacked subtlety and criticised its lyrics, writing, "Whatever pleasure can be generated from Bellamy's admirable melodic sense and overblown hooks is negated by Muse's insistence that they're profound rather than fun." Oliver Keens of Time Out London called the album's handling of the drones subject matter "tactless and crass" and its story "as dull as dog food – told with the wishy-washy flim-flam of a frothing conspiracy theorist ... We used to moan that musicians didn't write about politics anymore. Based on this effort, maybe that's for the best." Rolling Stone named it the 38th best album of 2015, calling it a "searing commentary on our era's vague dread, computer-driven death from above and Orwellian political climate ... It was the year's most convincing howl from the abyss.".

The Daily Telegraph wrote that "It's more than a little Spinal Tap, but if I was a teenage boy this is exactly the kind of thrilling madness that might turn me on to a moribund genre." The Evening Standard gave it four out of five and wrote: "Prog phobics might dismiss it as latter-day Pink Floyd with a dash of Noam Chomsky. But Bellamy's maturing songwriting has become more accessible, less prone to bluster. Drones is the fearsome sound of Muse at their monumental best."

Commercial performance
On the UK Albums Chart, Drones debuted at number one with sales of 72,863 copies, the third-highest opening of 2015 up to that point. It was Muse's fifth consecutive number-one album in the UK. It remained at number one in the second week, selling 24,445 copies (996 from streaming), bringing total sales to 97,308. It sold one million copies worldwide in 2015 and was the 19th best-selling album of the year. By 2016, it had sold approximately 170,000 copies in UK, 230,000 copies in the US, and 192,000 copies in France.

Drones debuted at number one on the US Billboard 200 in the week ending 14 June, earning 84,200 album-equivalent units in its first week (including 79,400 copies on traditional sales, 26,000 on single sales and 3.3 million on single streams), surpassing estimations. The album replaced How Big, How Blue, How Beautiful by Florence and the Machine in the previous week, the first time two British artists had debuted consecutively at number one on the US chart since 1956. Its traditional sales took Drones to number one of the Top Album Sales chart.

Track listing

Notes
"The Globalist" contains music based on "Nimrod" from the Enigma Variations, composed by Edward Elgar.
"Drones" contains music based on the "Benedictus" from Missa Papae Marcelli, composed by Giovanni Pierluigi da Palestrina.

Personnel
All personnel adapted from album liner notes.

Muse
Matt Bellamy – lead vocals, guitars, piano, keyboards, arrangements, production
Chris Wolstenholme – bass, backing vocals, production
Dominic Howard – drums, production

Technical personnel
Robert John "Mutt" Lange – production, backing vocals ("Mercy" and "Aftermath")
Rich Costey – additional production, mixing
Tommaso Colliva – additional production, engineering
Adam Greenholtz – additional engineering
Eric Mosher – engineering assistance
Giuseppe Salvadori – engineering assistance
Jacopo Dorici – engineering assistance
John Prestage – engineering assistance
Tom Bailey – engineering assistance
Marlo Borgatta – mixing assistance
Giovanni Versari – mastering
Bob Ludwig – mastering ("Dead Inside")
Matt Colton – mastering (vinyl half speed)
Olle "Sven" Romo – additional programming
Durand Trench – dialogue recording ("[Drill Sergeant]" and "Psycho")
Audrey Riley – string arrangements, conductor
Matt Mahurin – art direction, illustration, package design

Additional musicians and performers
Will Leon Thompson – dialogue (Drill Sergeant) ("[Drill Sergeant]" and "Psycho")
Michael Shiloah – dialogue (Recruit) ("[Drill Sergeant]" and "Psycho")
John F. Kennedy – recorded dialogue of April 1961 Secret Societies speech ("[JFK]")
Alessandro Cortini – modular synthesizers
Edoardo De Angelis – concertmaster, violin
Sarah Cross – violin
Freiherr von Dellingshausen – violin
Anna Minella – violin
Elia Mariani – violin
Gian Guerra – violin
Gian Lodigiani – violin
Gianmaria Bellisario – violin
Marco Corsini – violin
Michelle Torresetti – violin
Tommaso Belli – violin
Valerio D'Ercole – violin
Maria Lucchi – viola
Serena Palozzi – viola
Valentina Emilio Eria – viola
Andrea Scacchi – cello
Eliana Gintoli – cello
Francesco Sacco – cello
Martina Rudic – cello
Linati Omar – contrabass
Massimo Clavenna – contrabass

Charts

Weekly charts

Year-end charts

Certifications

Release history

References

2015 albums
Albums produced by Robert John "Mutt" Lange
Albums recorded at The Warehouse Studio
Grammy Award for Best Rock Album
Muse (band) albums
Warner Records albums